The Kaohsiung Municipal Social Education Hall is an educational center in Siaogang District, Kaohsiung, Taiwan.

History
In 1950, the Kaohsiung Social Education Work Team was established at the 228 Memorial Park area. In 1965, the team was restructured and became the Kaohsiung Municipal Social Education Center. In 1971, the center moved its office to Cianjin District. In 1995, the Cultural and Physical Activity Center for Youth was established in Siaogang District, and the center moved to the same venue and became the Kaohsiung Municipal Social Education Hall which was opened in the same year.

Architecture
The hall consists of various sections, ranging from performance auditorium, gallery, gymnasium, culture and art building, atrium etc. Its outdoor area holds various sport fields, such as paintball field, skating rink, camping area, barbecue area, etc.

Transportation
The museum is accessible within walking distance east from Siaogang Station of Kaohsiung MRT.

See also
 List of tourist attractions in Taiwan

References

External links

 

1995 establishments in Taiwan
Buildings and structures in Kaohsiung
Relocated buildings and structures in Taiwan
Science centers in Taiwan
Tourist attractions in Kaohsiung